"Adventure Time" is an animated short created by Pendleton Ward, as well as the pilot to the Cartoon Network series of the same name. The short follows the adventures of Pen (voiced by Zack Shada), a human boy, and his best friend Jake (voiced by John DiMaggio), a dog with magical powers to change shape and grow and shrink at will. In this episode, Pen and Jake have to rescue Princess Bubblegum (voiced by Paige Moss) from the antagonistic Ice King (voiced by John Kassir).

"Adventure Time" first aired on Nicktoons on January 11, 2007, and later was showed in Fred Seibert's Random! Cartoons series showcase on December 7, 2008, subsequently leading to the creation of the animated series. It was nominated for an Annie Award for Best Animated Short Subject. The short and the later-produced television series share elements, but the two differ slightly in setting, conception and continuity, especially in regard to the post-apocalyptic setting, which is only featured in the television series.

Plot
The short focused on a boy named Pen (later renamed Finn in the television series) and a dog named Jake as they learn from the Rainicorn that the Ice King has kidnapped Princess Bubblegum, in the hope of marrying her. Declaring that it's "Adventure Time", Pen and Jake set off to the Ice King's mountain lair. Pen and the Ice King fight while Jake remains outside flirting with Lady Rainicorn, ignoring the battle. Just when Pen seems to be gaining the upper hand, the Ice King uses his "frozen lightning bolts" to freeze Pen in a block of ice. For unexplained reasons, this transports Pen's mind back in time, and to Mars, where he has a short motivational conversation with Abraham Lincoln. After being told to believe in himself, Pen's mind is returned to the present, where he breaks out of the ice, just in time to see the Ice King fly away with Princess Bubblegum. Chasing after him using Jake's extendable legs, Pen rescues the princess from the Ice King's grasp. Jake pushes the magical crown off the Ice King's head, thereby removing the King's source of power. The Ice King then plummets off screen, yelling a long list of complex threats of things he will do when he returns. The story closes with Princess Bubblegum giving Pen a kiss; he enjoys it, but is also greatly embarrassed by the act. He attempts to leave, but Jake claims that they have nowhere else to go and that there are no adventures that need them. However, some nearby ninjas are stealing an old man's diamonds, and they both run off in pursuit.

Characters

 Pen (voiced by Zack Shada) – One of the two main protagonists of the short. According to Ward, he is "a little boy" who is "just hanging out". For the television series, he was renamed to Finn; the character would also go on to be voiced by Zack's younger brother Jeremy Shada.
 Jake (voiced by John DiMaggio) – The other main protagonist of the short. Jake is Pen's "pal", according to Ward. DiMaggio would voice the character in both the short and the later series.
 Princess Bubblegum (voiced by Paige Moss) – Princess Bubblegum is the damsel in distress. Voiced by Moss in the short, Bubblegum would later be voiced by Hynden Walch in the series.
 Rainicorn (voiced by Dee Bradley Baker) – Rainicorn would later be renamed "Lady Rainicorn" for the series, and would be voiced by Korean storyboard artist Niki Yang, rather than Dee Bradley Baker.
 Ice King (voiced by John Kassir) – The main antagonist of the short; Ward later called him a "nutbar" in an interview. Kassir voiced the character in the short, but Tom Kenny would later voice the Ice King in the series.

Production

"Adventure Time" was created by Pendleton Ward. The short's style was influenced by his time at California Institute of the Arts (CalArts). "Adventure Time" was Ward's first job in animation after he graduated from CalArts. Ward had been contacted by Eric Homan, the vice president of Development at Frederator Studios, after Homan saw one of Wards films at a CalArts animation screening called "The Producer's Show". Homan told Ward that he should consider pitching an idea to Frederator. Ward spent around two weeks storyboarding the outline for "Adventure Time", a process that he later called "exciting" because he was "jumping into it not knowing whether [he] would sink or swim."

During the initial storyboard pitch to Frederator Studios, Ward brought a guitar and played the episode's theme song. Frederator's CEO Fred Seibert was initially disinclined to make the short, feeling it was too much of a "student film" and without much commercial appeal. Longtime colleagues, development executive Homan and production executive Kevin Kolde convinced him otherwise, arguing that Seibert had actually laughed in the presentation, something that he did not often do. Frederator approved the pitch, and "Adventure Time" soon went into production.

Ward hired several of his recently graduated CalArts friends to work on the short with him. Neil Graf was tasked with coloring, Julian Narino was the background designer, and Adam Muto drew the props. Graf and Narino later got jobs with other series and studios—King of the Hill and Laika, respectively—but Muto continued working with Ward and eventually became Adventure Times co-executive producer and showrunner. The finished short ran for seven minutes, and production wrapped up in the spring of 2006.

Release and reception
"Adventure Time" first aired as part of Frederator Studios' Random! Cartoons on December 7, 2008. In between airings, it leaked onto the internet and went viral. According to Frederator Studios producer and founder Fred Seibert the short, "between all of its distribution points," had been viewed almost 3,000,000 times by April 2008. The feature was later nominated for an Annie Award for Best Animated Short Subject, although it did not win.

After its release and success, Frederator Studios then pitched an Adventure Time series to Nickelodeon, but the network passed on it twice. The studio then approached Cartoon Network. The network said they would be willing to produce the series if Ward could prove that "the seven-minute short made for Nick wasn't a one-hit wonder". Ward quickly retooled the concept of the pilot; he wanted a potential series to be "fully realized", rather than feature the "pre-school vibe" that he believed defined the original pilot. Initially, Ward submitted a rough storyboard that featured Finn and an "oblivious" Princess Bubblegum going on a spaghetti-supper date. However, the network was not happy with this story, and specifically asked for an episode that contained the same things that had "made the short so special, like the crazy opening dance, the 'Abe Lincoln moment,' funny catchwords, and the awkward princess/kiss moment at the end." Ward then created an early storyboard for the episode "The Enchiridion!", which was his attempt to emulate the style of the original short. Eventually, Cartoon Network approved the first season in September 2008, and "The Enchiridion!" became the first episode to enter into production.

References

Bibliography

External links

 Animation blog
 Production blog
 BCDB entry

2008 American television series debuts
Pilot
Fictional depictions of Abraham Lincoln in television
Frederator Studios
Mars in television
American television series premieres